Kelsey Leonard is the first Native American woman to earn a science degree from the University of Oxford, which she earned in 2012. She earned an MSc in water science, policy and management from St. Cross College, one of the thirty-eight colleges of the University of Oxford. Her master's thesis, “Water Quality For Native Nations: Achieving A Trust Responsibility”, discusses water quality regulation and how water resources on tribal land are not protected.

Kelsey Leonard is an enrolled member of the Shinnecock Indian Nation and is originally from the Shinnecock Indian Reservation on Long Island, New York. In 2010 she was the first member of the Shinnecock Nation to graduate from Harvard University. Her Harvard degree is a Bachelor of Arts degree in sociology and anthropology with a secondary field in ethnic studies.

Leonard earned a JD from Duquesne University, and a PhD in political science from McMaster University. She is now an assistant professor at the University of Waterloo.

References

Shinnecock people
Living people
Alumni of St Cross College, Oxford
McMaster University alumni
Duquesne University alumni
Academic staff of the University of Waterloo
Harvard University alumni
Year of birth missing (living people)
Women oceanographers
Earth scientists
Women earth scientists
21st-century Native Americans
Native American women scientists
21st-century Native American women